Predrag "Pedj" Bojić (born 9 April 1984) is an Australian football (soccer) player who last played professionally for Sydney FC.

Club career 
Bojić's professional career began at Australian club Parramatta Power in the 2000–01 season, where he played for two years. He went to Sydney Olympic and then moved to Northampton in England the following season on a free transfer after a successful trial.

Northampton Town 
Bojić joined the Cobblers at the start of the 2004–05 season, when he became a first team player. With Pedj playing a part, Northampton reached the play-off semi-finals, where they were beaten by Southend United. Next season, he and the club had more luck. He made 23 starts and 18 substitute appearances and scored four league goals as the club finished second in the league and won promotion.

In the 2006–07 season, Bojić played 30 times in League One. Bojić suffered a hernia injury in January 2007, which kept him out for two to four months and eventually led to the end of his Northampton Town career. He is remembered with fondness at Sixfields as a tough tackling right back who gave his all, and popped up with several spectacular goals.

Central Coast Mariners
On 28 July 2008, Bojić was signed to a one-year deal with the Mariners after impressing in several trials. After becoming a first team regular and impressing at the Mariners, Bojić signed a two-year contract extension on 9 October 2008.

Bojić was released by the Central Coast Mariners on 23 May 2013 and was expected to subsequently sign with Sydney FC.

On 20 July 2013, Bojić started for the A-League All Stars in the inaugural A-League All Stars Game against Manchester United, a match in which the A-League All Stars were thrashed 5–1, courtesy of goals from Danny Welbeck, Jesse Lingard and Robin van Persie. Bojić was substituted off in the 45th minute of the match, and was replaced by Perth Glory defender Joshua Risdon.

Sydney FC
Bojić signed with Sydney FC on a two-year deal on 19 June 2013. He made his first official appearance for the club in Round 1 of the 2013/14 A-League season at home to the Newcastle Jets. Sydney won the game 2–0 with Bojić putting in a strong performance on debut.

Bojić was released in January 2015.

Personal
Aside from playing professional football, Bojić has his own personal training business in Sydney  as well as being heavily involved with his clothing brand "A-List Limited". He is of Serbian heritage.

Honors

Club
Central Coast Mariners
 A-League Premiership: 2011–12
 A-League Championship: 2012–13

International
Australia U17
 OFC U-17 Championship: 2001

Individual
 A-League All Star: 2013

Career statistics

References

External links
 Central Coast Mariners profile
 OzFootball profile
 Pedj Bojic Interview (1)
 Pedj Bojic Interview (2)

1984 births
Australia youth international soccer players
Australian people of Serbian descent
A-League Men players
National Soccer League (Australia) players
English Football League players
Parramatta Power players
Sydney Olympic FC players
Northampton Town F.C. players
Central Coast Mariners FC players
Sydney FC players
Hakoah Sydney City East FC players
Australian expatriate soccer players
Soccer players from Sydney
Living people
Association football fullbacks
Australian soccer players